Paulo Dinarte Gouveia Pestana (born 30 January 1985 in Funchal, Madeira), commonly known as Paulinho, is a Portuguese former professional footballer who played as a midfielder.

References

External links

1985 births
Living people
Sportspeople from Funchal
Portuguese footballers
Madeiran footballers
Association football midfielders
Primeira Liga players
Segunda Divisão players
C.S. Marítimo players
Cypriot Second Division players
Onisilos Sotira players
Liga I players
Liga II players
FC Progresul București players
FC Astra Giurgiu players
CS Concordia Chiajna players
FC Universitatea Cluj players
CS Pandurii Târgu Jiu players
ASC Oțelul Galați players
TFF First League players
Göztepe S.K. footballers
Portugal youth international footballers
Portuguese expatriate footballers
Expatriate footballers in Cyprus
Expatriate footballers in Romania
Expatriate footballers in Turkey
Portuguese expatriate sportspeople in Cyprus
Portuguese expatriate sportspeople in Romania
Portuguese expatriate sportspeople in Turkey